An oblique icebreaker is a special type of icebreaker designed to operate not only ahead and astern, but also obliquely (sideways) with a large angle of attack. In this way, a relatively small icebreaker is capable of opening a wide channel in ice for large merchant ships.

The oblique icebreaker concept was developed in the late 1990s by Kværner Masa-Yards Arctic Technology Centre (MARC), the Finnish engineering company also responsible for the development of the double acting ships. The first vessel of this kind was ordered by the Russian Ministry of Transport on 8 December 2011 and was completed in 2014.

Development 

The development of the oblique icebreaker concept began in 1997, when Kværner Masa-Yards Arctic Technology Centre (MARC) established a project to develop new ways of assisting large tankers in ice conditions. The larger ships, fewer in number, could then be assisted with an unconventional method. The result was an asymmetrical, triangle-shaped vessel with three azimuth thrusters in the "corners" pushing the icebreaker with a 50-degree angle of attack—almost sideways—in ice. Model tests in an ice tank showed that the proposed concept was viable and that the resistance of a large cargo ship was considerably reduced in both level ice as well as frozen brash ice when operating behind the oblique icebreaker. The concept has been patented.

Over the years, the concept was further developed by MARC and its successor, Aker Arctic, together with ABB and the Finnish Funding Agency for Technology and Innovation (Tekes). In addition to icebreaking, the oblique vessel could also be utilized for oil spill response operations in both open and ice-infested waters by using the flat side to guide the oil to a recovery unit. However, there have also been doubts about the ability of the relatively small vessel to break a wide channel in ice without the much greater displacement and shaft power of a traditional icebreaker.

Construction 

On 8 December 2011, the Russian Ministry of Transport ordered an icebreaking multipurpose emergency and rescue vessel from Arctech Helsinki Shipyard (AHS), then a joint venture between the Finnish STX Finland Cruise Oy and the Russian United Shipbuilding Corporation. Initially, the hull of the  vessel referred to as "NB508" was to be built by Shipyard Yantar JSC in Yantar, Kaliningrad, where production began on 24 April 2012 and keel was laid on 6 July. However, instead of launching the unfinished hull in Kaliningrad and towing it to Helsinki for outfitting, the blocks were transported to Helsinki and the hull was assembled in Finland. The first blocks arrived on a barge on 9 April 2013 and the vessel, which was given the name Baltika, was completed in 2014. In 2015, the oblique icebreaker carried out ice trials in the Gulf of Ob where the sideways icebreaking was successfully demonstrated for the first time.

See also

References 

Ship types
Icebreakers